Tephroseris integrifolia subsp. maritima, also known as the spathulate fleawort or South Stack fleawort,  is endemic to Holyhead Island, occurring only around South Stack. It is a subspecies of the field fleawort Tephroseris integrifolia.

It is a single-stemmed plant, typically with more than six capitula (flower heads), which flowers between April and June.

References

External links

Article in this talks about the South Stack Cliffs RSPB reserve and shows a painting of South Stack Fleawort

Senecioneae
Endemic flora of Wales
Plant subspecies